Borden Mountain is located in the Savoy Mountain State Forest in Savoy, Massachusetts, USA.  The summit features a fire lookout tower.

References 

Berkshires
Mountains of Berkshire County, Massachusetts